Charles William Ward (July 30, 1894 in St. Louis, Missouri – April 4, 1969 in Indian Rocks, Florida), was a professional baseball player who played shortstop for the Pittsburgh Pirates in 1917 and the Brooklyn Robins from 1918 to 1922.

External links

1894 births
1969 deaths
Baseball players from Missouri
Brooklyn Robins players
Cincinnati Reds scouts
Falls City Colts players
Grand Island Collegians players
Grand Island Islanders players
Major League Baseball shortstops
Philadelphia Phillies scouts
Pittsburgh Pirates players
Portland Beavers players
Reading Keystones players
Toledo Mud Hens players